Pedana is a municipality and the headquarters of Pedana mandal under Machilipatnam revenue division of Krishna district of the Indian state of Andhra Pradesh.

Geography
It has an average elevation of 0.5 metres (3 feet).

Demographics
 India census, Pedana Municipality had a population of 30,835. Males constitute 50% of the population and females 50%. Pedana has an average literacy rate of 60%, higher than the national average of 59.5%: male literacy is 66%, and female literacy is 54%. In Pedana, 12% of the population under 6 years of age. This municipality was constituted in 1985 with 17 revenue wards and 20 election wards. Now this municipality has 23 election wards.

Governance 
Civic administration

Pedana municipality was formed in the year 1985.

Transport 

The town is well connected to many towns and cities by means of rail and road transport. NH 216 passes through the town which connects Digamarru and Ongole. Pedana railway station is classified as a D–category stations in the Vijayawada railway division of South Coast Railway zone.

Economy 

The handloom weaving is one of the main occupations of the town. They also use Kalamkari technique, a type of block printing using natural dyes onto cotton and Silk Fabric/Saree.

Education
The primary and secondary school education is imparted by government, aided and private schools, under the School Education Department of the state. The medium of instruction followed by different schools are English, Telugu

See also 
List of municipalities in Andhra Pradesh

References 

Towns in Krishna district
Mandal headquarters in Krishna district